Le Desert d'Entremont is a winter sports resort in the commune of Entremont-le-Vieux located in the Chartreuse Mountains. It lies between the communes of Entremont-le-Vieux and Corbel.

Introduction 
In winter, with presence of snow, we can practice downhill skiing , cross country skiing , sled , snowshoes, etc.

History
The ski station was built in 1968.

Events
Cross country skiing nights are sometimes organized. The tracks are lighted during the events.

References 

Ski stations in France
Tourist attractions in Savoie
Sports venues in Savoie